Sexsmith is a town in northern Alberta, it is on Highway 2,  north of Grande Prairie.

Sexsmith is located in the Peace River Country region of Alberta, one of the most fertile growing areas in the province. The town was once known as the "grain capital of the British Empire": In a 10-year period from 1939 to 1949, it shipped more grain than any other port in the empire.

History 
The townsite of Sexsmith was established on the homestead of Benny Foster, a 1911 settler, and was originally named "Bennville" or "Benville", but it was discovered that the name had already used by another town, so it was renamed Sexsmith after a local trapper who came to the area in 1898. The railway arrived in 1916, and grain companies began building grain elevators in 1917. Because of the fertile soil, the area is one of the largest grain producing areas in the world, and by 1949 became the Grain Capital of the British Empire, shipping more grain than any other region.

Demographics 

Economy 
Ovintiv owns an oil and natural gas liquid processing plant with a total capacity of 115,000 barrels per day, from wells drilled into the Montney Formation.

Sports

Education 
Sexsmith has three schools:
Robert W. Zahara Public School
Sexsmith Secondary School
St. Mary's Catholic School

Sexsmith is also the home of a post-secondary institution:
Peace River Bible Institute

Notable people

See also 
List of communities in Alberta
List of towns in Alberta

References

External links 

1929 establishments in Alberta
Towns in Alberta